Agia Triada (meaning the Holy Trinity) is a village in the northern part of the municipal unit of Lasiona, Elis, Greece. It is situated near the river Pineios, which forms the border with Achaea here. It is located 7 km northwest of Antroni, 7 km east of Simopoulo, 9 km south of Stavrodromi and 24 km north of Olympia. The Greek National Road 33 (Patras - Tripoli) runs through the village.

Historical population

See also
List of settlements in Elis

References

External links

 Agia Triada GTP Travel Pages

Populated places in Elis